Plew (also spelled Plu) is a small unincorporated community in western Lawrence County, Missouri, United States. Plew is located on former U.S. Route 66, now Route 96.

A post office called Plew was established in 1893, and remained in operation until 1904. It is unknown why the name Plew was applied to this community.

References

Unincorporated communities in Lawrence County, Missouri
Populated places established in the 1890s
Unincorporated communities in Missouri